Anthony Stephen da Cruz (born 24 December 1956 in Hong Kong) is a prominent horse trainer and former Champion Thoroughbred horse racing jockey.

Early life
Son of Johnny M. da Cruz, himself a well-known jockey, Tony Cruz is of Portuguese descent. He became an apprentice jockey at the age of 14.

Riding Career
Referred to as a racing legend by the Hong Kong Jockey Club, Cruz began his professional riding in 1973 and earned his first win on 11 December 1974 at Happy Valley Racecourse. After becoming one of Hong Kong's top jockeys, in the late 1980s he rode in England and France where he enjoyed considerable success, capturing a number of prestigious Group One races.

Cruz has been Hong Kong's champion jockey six times and has won more races there than any other jockey. When he retired from riding he embarked on a career as a trainer that has led to more success.

He won the Hong Kong Derby four times aboard Co-Tack (1983), Tea For Two II (1987), Clear City (1988), Makarpura Star (1995). He has also ridden to victory in the Hong Kong Champions & Chater Cup on two occasions. Overall, he won 946 wins in Hong Kong as a jockey.

Training Career
Cruz became a trainer in 1996-97 season. He has since won the trainer championship twice in 1999-2000 and 2004-05.

In 2010/11 in which he won 72 races, including two HKG1s and the G1 CXHK Mile with Beauty Flash, for a career total of 801.

Performance

Notable Horses
Notably he trained two-time Hong Kong Horse of the Year Silent Witness (2004, 2005) and his third straight Hong Kong Horse of the Year, 2006 winner, Bullish Luck.

As a trainer he won it in 2004 with Lucky Owners, and in 2008 with Helene Mascot.

References
 2004 article on Tony Cruz and Bullish Luck by About, Inc., a part of The New York Times Company
 TIME magazine article 8 February 2007 on Silent Witness and Tony Cruz
 Profile of Tony Cruz
 The Hong Kong Jockey Club – Trainer information
 The Hong Kong Jockey Club 

1956 births
Hong Kong jockeys
Hong Kong horse trainers
Hong Kong people of Portuguese descent
Living people